Under the Volcano is a novel by Malcolm Lowry.

Under the Volcano may also refer to:

 Under the Volcano (1984 film), a 1984 film adaptation of Lowry's novel
 Under the Volcano (2021 film), a 2021 music documentary film
 Under the Volcano (The Family Rain album), 2014
 Under the Volcano, an album by Rock and Hyde (previously known as Payolas), 1987
 Under the Volcano, an album by Stefan Grossman and John Renbourn, 1979
 Under the Volcano Festival, an annual activist, grassroots gathering in Canada